Józef Bohdan Zaleski (14 February 1802 in Bohatyrka, Kiev guberniya – 31 March 1886 in Villepreux, near Paris) was a Polish Romantic poet.  A friend of Adam Mickiewicz, Zaleski founded the "Ukrainian poetic school."

Life
Zaleski was a member of the secret patriotic organisation Związek Wolnych Polaków (1821); a participant of the November Uprising (1830–1831); a deputy of the Sejm (during the November Uprising 1830–1831); the co-founder (with Mickiewicz) of the religious brotherhood Towarzystwo Braci Zjednoczonych; and co-editor of a magazine, Nowa Polska.

Works
Zaleski was associated with Romanticism and sentimentalism. He was the author of popular historical dumas (in which he refers to Ukrainian folklore); love and reflective lyrics inspired  by folk poetry; religious poetry; as well as fantasy poems, sung poems, aphoristic poems, memoirs, translations (Serbian folk songs).
Three of his songs were set to music by Frédéric Chopin (see Polish songs by Frédéric Chopin).

 Dumas
 Dumka hetmana Kosińskiego (Dumka of Hetman Kosiński, 1823)
 Dumka Mazepy (Mazepa's Dumka)
 Czajki

 Poems and lyrics
 Duch od stepu (The Spirit from the Steppe, 1841 poem) 
 Jamby (Iambs), aphoristic poem
 Przenajświętsza Rodzina (The Most Holy Family, 1839; published in Poezje [Poems], vol. 2, 1842), religious poem
 Pyłki (Dust), aphoristic poem
 Rojenia wiośniane — sung poem
 Rusałki (1829) — fantasy poem
 Śliczny chłopiec — sung poem
 Śpiew poety (1823) — lyric
 Tędy, tędy leciał ptaszek — sung poem
 Duch od stepu (The Spirit from the Steppe, 1841 poem)

 Collections
 Pisma zbiorowe (Collected Writings, vols. 1–4, 1877)
 Dzieła pośmiertne (Posthumous Works, vols. 1–2, 1891)
 Korespondencja (Correspondence, vols. 1–5, 1900–04)

See also
List of Poles

References

 
 
 

1802 births
1886 deaths
Polish male poets
Polish fantasy writers
Polish translators
November Uprising participants
Recipients of the Virtuti Militari
Romantic poets
Activists of the Great Emigration
19th-century translators
19th-century Polish poets
19th-century Polish male writers
University of Warsaw alumni